= Bir Silgi Bir Kalem =

Turkish crowdfunding platform

- Company type: Nonprofit organization
- Founded: 2012
- Headquarters: Istanbul, Turkey
- Key people: Onur Aydin, founder Caglar Kaya, General Coordinator
- Number of employees: 10
- Website: www.birsilgibirkalem.org

Bir Silgi Bir Kalem (One Eraser One Pencil) is a Turkish children's charity organization.

== History ==
Bir Silgi Bir Kalem was founded in 2012 by Onur Aydin, a Harvard Business School MBA. He and his colleagues envisioned a two-sided platform for individuals to connect directly with classrooms in need, providing materials requested by teachers. With the support and funding from Turkish Philanthropy Funds, he had the first version of the site built in 2012 and started to spread the word.

Throughout 2012–2013, BirSilgiBirKalem was featured in several national newspapers of Turkey (including Milliyet, Radikal and Hurriyet) and several TV shows and news programs. The press coverage helped BirSilgiBirKalem get traction steadily and the organization continued to receive attention in social media. As the number of schools and donors grew, the organization was recognized and awarded for its original solution to a major problem by Ashoka, Sabancı Foundation and several other organizations. In 2015, Google for Non-Profits selected Bir Silgi Bir Kalem as one of the non-profits it would support in Turkey. As a result of this free advertising support, BirSilgiBirKalem took off. The donations in 2015 alone were bigger than the sum of all donation of the previous three years. As of January 2017, Bir Silgi Bir Kalem had gained over 1.5 million, and has helped more than 100,000 students across Turkey.

== Donation process ==
=== Schools ===
Verified teachers create profiles for their institutions by uploading images and providing brief information about their schools and specific requests. To submit in-kind donation requests, each school must register using official credentials issued by the Turkish Ministry of Education.

After a donation is completed and the school receives the goods, the teacher is required to provide proof that the items are being used for educational purposes. This includes submitting photographs of students using the donated materials and a letter addressed to the donor, preferably written by the students themselves.

=== Donors ===
Donors have the option to purchase the goods they wish to donate offline or online. After the donation, donors can monitor the progress of their donation through the website. Upon the donation reaching the school and the students, every donor receives a letter from the relevant institution.

== Collaboration ==
BirSilgiBirKalem is funded by Turkish Philanthropy Funds and is also supported by Google for Non-Profits and receives US$10K awards credits every month to fuel its growth.

Yurtici Kargo, Turkey's largest courier company, is also a supporter and provides discounted prices to BirSilgiBirKalem donors.

Other well known past and present supporters include Vitamin Egitim, Ashoka, Bilgi University, and Sabancı Foundation.

== Statistics ==
As of January 2017, donors had contributed over 1.5 million (of which close to 1M came in 2015) to help more than 100.000 students across Turkey.

== Awards ==
- Google for Non-Profits Grant 2016
- Sabancı Foundation Change Makers Award 2014
- Bilgi University Social Entrepreneurship Award 2013
- Ashoka Fellowship Award 2013
